Bagh-e Nazar (also Romanized as Bāgh-e Naẓar; also known as Bāghnaẓar) is a village in Mir Shams ol Din Rural District, in the Central District of Tonekabon County, Mazandaran Province, Iran. At the 2006 census, its population was 256, in 69 families.

References 

Populated places in Tonekabon County